The "For heroism" Medal is a medal of Azerbaijan.

Description 
There is an in-profile picture of a soldier with a helmet on head and a bayonet in hand against the background of an eight-pointed star. "For heroism" inscription is carved along a circle to the left side of the soldier. The inscription and picture are salient. 

The reverse side of the medal is flat and a number of the medal is carved in its center. The medal is attached to a thin rectangular plate, which is covered with a 27 mm X 43 mm dark and light green ribbon, with an eye ring. There is a rectangular block with national ornaments on the bottom and an element for pinning it to the chest on the reverse side of the medal.

See also
Orders, decorations, and medals of Azerbaijan

References 

Military awards and decorations of Azerbaijan
Awards established in 1998
1998 establishments in Azerbaijan